Dendropsophus giesleri is a species of frog in the family Hylidae.
It is endemic to Brazil.
Its natural habitats are subtropical or tropical moist lowland forests, subtropical or tropical moist montane forests, freshwater marshes, and intermittent freshwater marshes.
It is threatened by habitat loss.

References

giesleri
Endemic fauna of Brazil
Amphibians described in 1950
Taxonomy articles created by Polbot